János Rátkai (born 30 May 1951) is a Hungarian sprint canoeist who competed from the early 1970s to the early 1980s. Competing in three Summer Olympics, he won a silver medal in the K-2 1000 m event at Munich in 1972.

Rátkai also won eight medals at the ICF Canoe Sprint World Championships with two golds (K-2 1000 m and K-4 1000 m: both 1973), three silvers (K-2 500 m: 1973, 1974; K-4 10000 m: 1977), and three bronzes (K-2 1000 m: 1975, K-4 1000 m: 1974, 1975).

References

External links
 
 

1951 births
Canoeists at the 1972 Summer Olympics
Canoeists at the 1976 Summer Olympics
Canoeists at the 1980 Summer Olympics
Hungarian male canoeists
Living people
Olympic canoeists of Hungary
Olympic silver medalists for Hungary
Olympic medalists in canoeing
ICF Canoe Sprint World Championships medalists in kayak
Medalists at the 1972 Summer Olympics
20th-century Hungarian people